William Patrick Shannon  (9 December 1909 – 1995) was an Anglican priest, most notably Provost of St Andrew's Cathedral, Aberdeen from 1955 until 1965.

Shannon was born in Glasgow in 1909, educated at  the University of Glasgow and Edinburgh Theological College, and ordained in 1934. After  curacies in  Edinburgh he was  Rector of Haddington from 1939 until 1946 and then of Elgin until his appointment as Provost.

He died in 1995.

References

1909 births
1995 deaths
Clergy from Glasgow
Alumni of the University of Glasgow
Alumni of Edinburgh Theological College
Provosts of St Andrew's Cathedral, Aberdeen